We Speak: Black Artists in Philadelphia, 1920s–1970s was an art exhibition held at the Woodmere Art Museum from September 26, 2015 through January 24, 2016. It included artists from Philadelphia who were active from the 1920s through the 1970s. Many of those artist were invlolved with the Pyramid Club and other local organizations. The exhibit included paintings, photographs, prints, drawings and sculpture from the New Negro movement of the 1920s, the Works Progress Administration print works of the 1930s and the Civil rights era.

Artists
The following artists were included in the show:

 James Atkins 
 Roland Ayers 
 James Brantley 
 Benjamin Britt  
 Moe Brooker 
 Samuel J. Brown 
 Barbara Bullock  
 Selma Burke 
 Donald Eugene Camp  
 Barbara Chase-Riboud 
 Laura Williams Chassot (b. 1942)
 Claude C.F. Clark  
 Louise Clement–Hoff 
 Reba Dickerson-Hill 
 Aaron Douglas 
 John E. Dowell Jr.  
 James Dupree  
 Allan L. Edmunds  
 Walter Edmonds 
 Allan R. Freelon, Sr. 
 Meta Vaux Warrick Fuller  
 Reginald Gammon  
 John T. Harris
 Barkley L. Hendricks 
 Humbert L. Howard  
 Edward Ellis Hughes
 Charles Jay, (b. 1947)
 LeRoy Johnson 
 Martina Johnson-Allen 
 Edward Jones (b. 1942) 
 Ida Jones 
 Paul F. Keene Jr. 
 Columbus Knox 
 Edward L. Loper Sr. 
 John W. Mosley 
 Jerry Pinkney 
 Horace Pippin  
 Charles Aaron Pridgen 
  Raymond Saunders  
 Charles Searles 
 Twins Seven Seven 
  Louis Sloan  
 Raymond Steth 
 Henry Ossawa Tanner 
 Dox Thrash 
 Ellen Powell Tiberino  
 Laura Wheeler Waring  
 Howard Watson 
 Richard J. Watson 
 Deborah Willis

References

External links
We Speak: Black Artists in Philadelphia, 1920s–1970s includes video interviews of the artists
We Speak: Black Artists in Philadelphia, 1920s–1970s catalogue online 

2015 in art
2015 in Philadelphia
Art exhibitions in the United States